Salinas Union High School District is a public school district in Monterey County, California, United States. The feeder districts are Alisal Union, Graves, Lagunita, Salinas City, Santa Rita, Spreckels and Washington Union. As of the 2014–2015 school year, the enrollment number in the district was around 14,000.  Its schools, consisting of middle schools and high schools, are: Alisal High School, El Puente School, El Sausal Middle School, Everett Alvarez High School, Harden Middle School, La Paz Middle School, Mission Trails ROP, Mount Toro High School, North Salinas High School, Rancho San Juan High School, Salinas Adult School, Salinas High School, and Washington Middle School.

References

External links
 

School districts in Monterey County, California